Milton District High School (MDHS) is a public secondary school located in Milton, Ontario, Canada. MDHS, which is commonly referred to as M.D. by locals, is part of the Halton District School Board, and educates approximately 1800 students.

The school opened in 1960, before which time secondary school students in town had attended the Milton High School on Martin Street. When the new high school opened, grade 10 to 12 students were transferred there, and Martin Street School  became a high school, serving students in grade 9 only. MDHS remained the only secondary school in Milton until E.C. Drury High School  opened in 1980, followed by Bishop P. F. Reding Catholic Secondary School  in 1986.

Canadian Improv Games National Gold Champions in 2012
IN 2010, the MDHS Improv Team were national finalists in the Canadian Improv Games held at the National Arts Centre in Ottawa. They placed 4th, among approximately 400 teams from across the country.

IN 2011, the MDHS Improv Team placed first, winning gold in the Toronto Regionals of the Canadian Improv Games, moving on to the National Arts Centre in Ottawa for the national competition.

IN 2012, the MDHS Improv Team again placed first and won gold in the Toronto Regionals. At the National competition of the Canadian Improv Games at the National Arts Centre in Ottawa, Milton placed first in the semi-finals then continued to win gold in finals night. They are currently the national champions in CIG.

Hurricane Ivan
Hurricane Ivan struck Grenada in September 2004 and staff and students from the School spent their March break visiting Grenada to help with the rebuilding process. Radio Canada interviewed them from the scene.

Censorship controversy
A Milton student's parent opposed the use of a novel, Foxfire: Confessions of a Girl Gang, written by Joyce Carol Oates, in the grade 12 advanced English course, due to its themes of sexuality and violence, and the profane language used. This raised significant questions about the extent to which books used in high schools should be censored and Ontario's former education minister John Snobelen said that he sympathised with the group Parents Against Corrupt Teachers who lobbied the Halton board of education to remove Foxfire from the school.

Transport petition
On October 2, 2000 Halton Hills Council agreed to forward to Transport Canada a petition from students of Milton
District High School, E.C. Drury School, and Georgetown District High
School that requested the installation of a set of barriers at the CN Rail railway crossing at Fourth Line.

Athletics
While a student at the school, Steph Fennell was the silver medallist at the Eastern Canada Cup and a semifinalist at the Canadian Summer Nationals, both in the 100-yard backstroke. The school has a large football and soccer field.

Robotics
Milton District is home to FIRST Robotics Competition team 3571

Chess Club
Milton District High School's Chess Club is renowned for its accomplished players and excellent turnout rate. It was started by Zian Raheem in 2019, and has continued in its successful prowess since.

Notable alumni
 Chris Hadfield, the first Canadian to walk in space.
 David James Elliott, star of the television series JAG.
 John Tonelli, NHL Centre Forward and four-time Stanley Cup Champion
 Peter McDuffe , NHL & WHA Goaltender
 Bruce Hood, NHL Referee
 Nick Hector, award-winning filmmaker and academic
 Kayla Alexander, WNBA centre.
 Kyle Alexander, NBA/Liga ACB  forward-center.
 Mark Saunders, Chief of the Toronto Police Service

Gallery

See also
List of high schools in Ontario

References

External links
Milton District High School

Educational institutions established in 1960
High schools in the Regional Municipality of Halton
Milton, Ontario
1960 establishments in Ontario